Igor Vladimirovich Chumak (born 1 April 1964 in Vladivostok) is a Russian team handball player. He became Olympic champion in 1988 with the Soviet Union national handball team, and in 1992 with the Unified Team.

References

External links
 

1964 births
Living people
Soviet male handball players
Russian male handball players
Handball players at the 1988 Summer Olympics
Handball players at the 1992 Summer Olympics
Olympic gold medalists for the Soviet Union
Olympic gold medalists for the Unified Team
Olympic handball players of the Soviet Union
Olympic handball players of the Unified Team
Olympic medalists in handball
Sportspeople from Vladivostok
Medalists at the 1992 Summer Olympics
Medalists at the 1988 Summer Olympics